Roberto Font (October 21, 1904 – June, 1981) was a Mexican film actor who settled and worked in Spain.

Selected filmography
 The Party Goes On (1948)
 I'm Not Mata Hari (1949)
 A Thief Has Arrived (1950)
 Fog and Sun (1951)
 Yankee Dudler (1973)

References

Bibliography
 Goble, Alan. The Complete Index to Literary Sources in Film. Walter de Gruyter, 1999.

External links

1904 births
1981 deaths
Mexican male film actors
Mexican emigrants to Spain
Male actors from San Luis Potosí
20th-century Mexican male actors